A Life Once Lost was an American metal band based in Pennsylvania.

History 
A Life Once Lost formed in 1999 in a suburb of Philadelphia, Pennsylvania. After the release of their first album, Open Your Mouth for the Speechless... in Case of Those Appointed to Die, on Robotic Empire, they toured with Canadian band The End. After a second release on Deathwish Inc., A Life Once Lost released their third album, Hunter, on Ferret Music in 2005. The group supported the release by touring with Throwdown, Zao, As I Lay Dying, Lamb of God, Clutch, Opeth, and Strapping Young Lad, and took Part in the Ozzfest 2006.

In September 2007, the album Iron Gag was released, featuring musical guests Devin Townsend of Strapping Young Lad, Anthony Green of Circa Survive, and Randy Blythe of Lamb of God. The band supported the album with tours alongside High on Fire, The Dillinger Escape Plan, Saviours, Suicide Silence, and Job for a Cowboy.

The band toured Europe twice in 2008 alongside Himsa and War from a Harlots Mouth, respectively. In 2008, the band headed to Scandinavia and later performed two shows in Russia. In April 2009 the band headed to Alaska for three performances. In May 2009, the band embarked on the You've Got Mail Tour with Thy Will Be Done as direct support.

In March 2012, the band began recording a fifth studio album with producer Andreas Magnusson. Titled Ecstatic Trance, it was released on October 23, 2012. The band toured throughout the fall of 2012 to support the album as an opener for Revocation, along with Canadian band KEN mode.

The band announced their breakup on July 12, 2013.

Members

Final lineup 
 Robert Meadows – vocals 
 Douglas Sabolick – guitar, backing vocals 
 Jordan Crouse – drums 
 John Roth – guitar, backing vocals 
 Chris Weyh – bass

Past members 
 T.J. deBlois – drums 
 Justin Graves – drums 
 Nick Frasca – bass 
 Robert Carpenter – guitar 
 Vadim Taver – guitar 
 Richard Arnold – bass 
 Nick Hale – bass
 Mike Sabolick – bass
 Alin Ashraf – bass guitar

Discography 
Studio albums
Open Your Mouth for the Speechless... in Case of Those Appointed to Die (2000)
A Great Artist (2003)
Hunter (2005)
Iron Gag (2007)
Ecstatic Trance (2012)

Extended plays
The Fourth Plague: Flies (2001)

References

External links
 

American groove metal musical groups
Deathwish Inc. artists
Heavy metal musical groups from Pennsylvania
Musical groups disestablished in 2013
Musical groups established in 1999
Musical groups from Philadelphia
Musical quintets
Season of Mist artists
Ferret Music artists
1999 establishments in Pennsylvania
2013 disestablishments in Pennsylvania
Metalcore musical groups from Pennsylvania